{{Automatic_taxobox 
|image = 
|image_caption =|taxon = Cellariopsis
|authority = A. J. Wagner, 1914
|type_species = 
|synonyms_ref=
|synonyms=
 Oxychilus (Cellariopsis) A. J. Wagner, 1914
 Schistophallus (Cellariopsis) A. J. Wagner, 1914
|display_parents= 3
}}Cellariopsis is a genus of  small air-breathing land snails, terrestrial pulmonate gastropods in the subfamily Oxychilinae of the family Oxychilidae, the glass snails.

Species
 Cellariopsis deubeli'' (A. J. Wagner, 1914)

References

 Bank, R. A. (2017). Classification of the Recent terrestrial Gastropoda of the World. Last update: July 16th, 2017. 

Cellariopsis
Gastropod genera